The 2011 Davis Cup (also known as the 2011 Davis Cup by BNP Paribas for sponsorship purposes) was the 100th edition of a tournament between national teams in men's tennis. Spain was the championship team, winning the final over Argentina, 3–1.

The draw took place in September 2010 in Brussels, Belgium.

World Group

Seeds:

Draw

Final

World Group play-offs

Date: 16–18 September

The eight losing teams in the World Group first round ties and eight winners of the Zonal Group I final round ties will compete in the World Group play-offs for spots in the 2012 World Group.

Seeded teams
 
 
 
 
 
 
 
 

Unseeded teams

 
 
 
 
 
  
 
 

Americas Zone

Group I

Seeds:
 
 

Remaining Nations:

Draw

Group II

Seeds:
 
 
 
 

Remaining Nations:

Draw

Group III

 
 
  – promoted to 2012 Davis Cup Americas Zone Group II
  – promoted to 2012 Davis Cup Americas Zone Group II
 
 
 
 

Honduras and Jamaica finished in the relegation places.  However, in 2012 Groups III and IV were merged, so no demotion occurred.

Group IV

  – promoted to 2012 Davis Cup Americas Zone Group III
  – promoted to 2012 Davis Cup Americas Zone Group III
  - promoted by default, as Groups III and IV were merged for 2012

Asia/Oceania Zone

Group I

Seeds:
 
 

Remaining Nations:

Draw

Group II

Seeds:
 
 
 
 

Remaining Nations:
 
 
  Pacific Oceania

Draw

Group III

 
  – promoted to 2012 Davis Cup Asia/Oceania Zone Group II
 
  – relegated to 2012 Davis Cup Asia/Oceania Zone Group IV

 
  – promoted to 2012 Davis Cup Asia/Oceania Zone Group II
  – relegated to 2012 Davis Cup Asia/Oceania Zone Group IV

Group IV

 
  – promoted to 2012 Davis Cup Asia/Oceania Zone Group III
 
 

  – promoted to 2012 Davis Cup Asia/Oceania Zone Group III

Europe/Africa Zone

Group I

Seeds:
 
 
 
 

Remaining Nations:

Draw

Group II

Seeds:
 
 
 
 
 
 
 
 

Remaining Nations:

Draw

Group III Europe

 
 
 
 
 
 

 
  – promoted to 2012 Davis Cup Europe/Africa Zone Group II
 
 
 
  – promoted to 2012 Davis Cup Europe/Africa Zone Group II

Group III Africa

 
 
 
 
 
  – promoted to 2012 Davis Cup Europe/Africa Zone Group II
 

 
 
  – promoted to 2012 Davis Cup Europe/Africa Zone Group II

References

External links

Official Site

 
Davis Cup
Davis Cups by year